Baba Luba is an Israeli documentary that follows musician Danny Bassan on his journey to Brazil to find his long-lost father. It won the Best Documentary category at the Israeli Film Academy Awards.

See also
 Cinema of Israel
 Culture of Israel

References

External links
Danny Bassan's music
The Jewish Channel's review
New Israeli Foundation for Cinema
Amythos Films website
 

Israeli documentary films
1995 films
Documentary films about Jews and Judaism
Hebrew-language films
Documentary films about music and musicians
1995 documentary films
1990s English-language films